Boohbah is a British preschool television series created by Anne Wood and produced by Wood's company, Ragdoll Productions, in association with GMTV. It originally premiered on ITV on 14 April 2003. The series was later broadcast on Nick Jr.UK beginning on 2 April 2005.

The series, with 104 episodes, was designed for preschoolers aged three to six (a slightly older age group than Wood's previous show, Teletubbies).

According to Anne Wood, the show's visuals were inspired by scientific photographs of microscopic life and cell structures. The main characters, the Boohbahs, are "atoms of energy" who sleep in charging pods. Every episode follows the Boohbahs performing a dance routine where the audience is encouraged to participate. The creators at Ragdoll Productions designed the show as an interactive "televisual game" with an emphasis on spatial awareness, motor skill development and puzzle solving.

Characters
Episodes of Boohbah are divided into two main segments: one featuring the Boohbahs and another featuring the Storypeople.

Boohbahs
The series focuses on the Boohbahs, five colourful creatures who are described as "magical atoms" of energy. They are played by actors in full-body costumes. Their fur sparkles and shimmers with tiny lights, and they have big eyes and rows of lights for eyebrows. Each Boohbah is a different colour:
 Humbah, played by Emma Insley, is a yellow Boohbah.
 Zumbah, played by Alex Poulter, is a purple Boohbah.
 Zing Zing Zingbah, played by Cal Jaggers, is an orange Boohbah.
 Jumbah, played by Phil Hayes, is a blue Boohbah.
 Jingbah, played by Laura Pero, is a pink Boohbah.

Storypeople
The Storypeople are silent human characters whose actions are controlled by off-screen children using the magic word "Boohbah". Every episode of Boohbah includes a segment where the Storypeople are magically given a present. The Los Angeles Times called these segments "comic visual puzzles executed with vaudevillian flair."
 Grandmamma (Linda Kerr-Scott) – An elderly yet spry Caucasian woman. She has white banana hair and wears a dark pink housedress, pastel blue sweater, white socks, and red trainers.
 Grandpappa (Robin Stevens) – An elderly yet spry Caucasian man. He has white hair and a white moustache; he wears a long-sleeved yellow shirt, dark grey slacks, red braces, and white trainers.
 Mrs. Lady (Harvey Virdi) – An Indian woman. She has dark hair and wears a loose light blue blouse, loose bright pink trousers, and pink trainers.
 Mr. Man (Mark Ramsey) – A Black man. He wears a short-sleeved bright pink shirt, white trousers, and black trainers.
 Brother (Manuel Bravo) and Sister (Vee Vimolmal) – Always paired, they both appear to be in their late teens. Brother is a Spanish boy with short black hair; he wears a bright blue T-shirt, bright red knee-length shorts, and white trainers with pink laces. Sister is a Thai girl with hip-length black hair in a long ponytail; she wears a bright red T-shirt, bright blue capri pants, and white trainers with pink laces.
 Auntie (Sachi Kimura) – A Japanese woman. She has short black hair and wears a long-sleeved lavender blouse, black trousers, purple tights, and black shoes.
 Little Dog Fido (Dash) – A Jack Russell Terrier. He wears a red collar. He is the only character in Storyworld who is not wholly controlled by the magic word "Boohbah".

Development and broadcast
Production of Boohbah began shortly after Ragdoll released a direct-to-video Teletubbies release titled Teletubbies Go! in 2001, which featured segments of the characters exercising. The high sales of the release led to Ragdoll's fear of obesity in children and what led the company to develop an exercise-based programme.

In November 2002, ITV's pre-school strand CITV and breakfast franchisee GMTV signed a five-year broadcast commitment deal with Ragdoll where both broadcasters would share weekday and weekend broadcasts of the series in the United Kingdom respectively. 104 episodes were planned to be split into two series, with the first airing in Spring 2003, and the second series being broadcast in 2004. On the same day, it was announced that Video Collection International, who recently had an existing home video deal with Ragdoll, would release the series on VHS and DVD in the country.

The series premiered as planned on ITV on 14 April 2003 and later debuted on GMTV's weekend pre-school slot at the same time. Ragdoll held worldwide distribution rights to the series.

In June 2003, Ragdoll announced their plans to launch Boohbah in the United States. They confirmed that PBS, Scholastic and Hasbro, the same companies who held the licenses to Teletubbies in the United States, had acquired TV, publishing and toy rights respectively. In the United Kingdom, the first DVD release: Boohbah Magic, was released on May 26, and shot into the Children's Charts at No. 2. In October 2003, Ragdoll announced that Canal+ and the Australian Broadcasting Corporation had acquired French and Australian broadcast rights to the series, where the series would launch in January 2004 and Spring 2004 window in both regions. Ragdoll also announced that the show would premiere in the United States on PBS on January 19, 2004. In the same month, Hasbro signed a separate worldwide toy deal for the show except for the UK, Ireland, Americas and Asia.

In March 2004, Ragdoll announced that the second series would premiere in the UK on CITV on the 16th. In the same month, another VHS/DVD release - "Squeaky Socks", was announced to be released on May 10. At MIPTV 2004 within the same month, Ragdoll announced more broadcast deals for the show. Treehouse TV acquired the series in English-speaking Canada and would begin airing on April 26, complementing an earlier French-speaking deal with Société Radio-Canada. It was also announced that BabyTV in Israel and POGO in India were already broadcasting the series as well. Canal 13 in Chile and TV12 in Singapore also acquired the broadcast rights in their respective countries for broadcast later on in 2004. Another deal already announced was one with Viacom International, where Nickelodeon in the Netherlands and MTV in Belgium acquired the Dutch-speaking rights, where the show would air on the Nick Jr. blocks for both channels beginning on 5 April 2004. In October, Ragdoll pre-sold the series to Guangzhou Beauty in China for a launch within Chinese New Year 2005.

In March 2005, Nick Jr.UK acquired the UK pay-TV rights to the series, and the series would premiere on the channel on 2 April 2005. The programme became a regular fixture of the Nick Jr. UK schedule, airing seven days a week at 7:00 a.m. to start off Nick Jr.'s morning schedule. In July 2005, Ragdoll announced that the show would premiere on CCTV's Youth Channel in China on the 11th. SABC 2 was also announced to have acquired the South African broadcast rights, and would premiere the show in the country on the same day.

In the United States, the series was aired on PBS Kids weekdays at 8:30 am from 19 January 2004 until 1 September 2006, Saturdays at 5:00 am from 28 August 2004 to 16 January 2010, and Sundays at 6:30 am from 5 July 2009 to 30 August 2009. It also aired on PBS Kids Sprout from 2005 to 2009, where it was shown as part of the programming blocks "Sprout Mornings" and "The Good Night Show."

Episodes
Two series, each containing 52 episodes, were produced for a total of 104 episodes. Many episodes were written by Robin Stevens, who played Grandpappa on the show.

Season 1

Season 2

Reception
Ken Tucker, in his review for Entertainment Weekly, gave the show an "A−" score and commented, "I'm positive that Boohbah can be experienced by both its intended audience (kids ages 3 to 6) and its inevitable inadvertent audience (doting parents and stoners of every age) as a mind-blowing gas." Tucker joked that when Boohbah aired in America, it would prove more popular than The Price Is Right due to having more "flashing lights, blinding colors, and silly noise". Lorraine Ali, a senior writer for Newsweek, also gave Boohbah a positive review and wrote, "Move over, Barney, and make room for Zing Zing Zingbah." Common Sense Media gave Boohbah a rating of 3/5 stars, writing that its educational and fitness goals were "admirable", but that "the real test is whether or not the show works with your kid."

The New York Times Magazine commented that although the show's sequence of events "may sound incoherent ... the overall effect is mesmerizing, sometimes funny, even beautiful." The Boston Globe felt that the "segments featuring the Boohbahs are ploddingly slow, maddeningly repetitive, and without much purpose ... the live-action segments with real people are the only things worth watching." Slate was bemused by the show's segments and design, feeling that Boohbah was less effective than Anne Wood's previous show Teletubbies: "For all its earnest intentions, Boohbah lacks both the conceptual purity of Teletubbies and its sublimely silly sensibility." Cheat Sheet ranked the show first on their list of "5 Most Horrifying TV Shows That Aren't Supposed to Be Scary", criticising the characters' appearances, although crediting it for encouraging children to perform in physical exercise.

References

External links

Boohbah at NickJr.co.uk (archive)

ITV children's television shows
British children's fantasy television series
Television series by DHX Media
Television series by Ragdoll Productions
2000s British children's television series
2000s preschool education television series
2003 British television series debuts
2006 British television series endings
English-language television shows
British preschool education television series